Beder Meye Josna is a 1989 Bangladeshi film directed by Tojammel Haque Bokul. The film stars Ilias Kanchan and Anju Ghosh in the lead roles.

This story was taken from a very old rural Bengali play of the same name. The tune of the title song, "Beder meye Jyotsna amay katha diyeche," was adopted from the song "Ek pardesi mera dil le gaya" from the film Phagun (1958).

Plot
In Bengal, Bede means a caste or group of people who make their living by catching snakes and entertaining people by making the snakes dance to the tune of there flutes. Josna is a girl from this community. One day a poisonous snake bites the foot of a local prince. A bede is called to cure the prince. He sees the wound and declares that only Josna can extract the poison from the prince's blood. The king calls Josna and asks her to save his son, in exchange for which he agrees to give her anything she wants. Josna cures the prince but becomes ill in the process. After her mother and the queen pray for her, she recovers and demands the hand of the prince as her reward, but the king balks. When the prince, now recovered, learns what has transpired, he falls in love with Jyotsna. After a long tug-of-war, the couple persuade the king to consent to their union and they marry.

Cast
 Ilyas Kanchan - Anwar
 Anju Ghosh - Josna
 Mithun - Razzaq
 Farzana Bobby - Tara
 Saifuddin Ahmed - Bede Sardar
 Nasir Khan - Mubarak
 Shawkat Akbar - Sagar Mudak
 Prabir Mitra - Apon Mudak
 Rawshan Jamil - Zosner's grandmother
 Dildar - Moni
 Abbas - Zamindar
 Sushma
 Maya Chowdhury
 Manzur Rahi
 Nader
 Ghulam Sharif Khan
 Fazal Rahman

Music 

Abu Taher directed the music of Beder's daughter Josna. The film has eleven songs. The film's director Tozammel Haque Bakul is composing the lyrics for ten of these eleven songs. The audio cassette of the film's songs sold one lakh copies within a month of its release. The song, written by Veda's daughter Josna Amay, became a huge hit. Besides, the song 'Ami Bandi Jail' written by Hasan Matiur Rahman and sung by Mujib Pardesi is still popular.

Reception
This is the highest grossing Bangladeshi film earned approximately ৳20 crore gross. The film was ranked among the top 10 films of Bangladesh in a survey by British Film Institute.

Remake
The film was remade in West Bengal in 1991 with the same name. The film stars Chiranjeet Chakraborty. In 2019, production company named Banga BD bought the rights from Anandamela Cholocchitro for another remake of the film.

Sequel
In 2018, producer Nader Khan of Rajesh Film proposed a sequel to the film on the day of reception ceremony for Anju Ghosh at Bangladesh Film Development Corporation named Josna Keno Bonobase.

References

External links

1989 romantic drama films
Bengali-language Bangladeshi films
Bangladeshi romantic drama films
1980s Bengali-language films
Bengali films remade in other languages
Films scored by Abu Taher
Bangladeshi musical drama films